Homopholis arnoldi is a species of gecko. It is endemic to southern Zimbabwe.

References

Endemic fauna of Zimbabwe
Homopholis
Reptiles described in 1944